Botond Kőszegi is an economist and a professor at Central European University.

Early life and education 

A bronze medallist in the International Math Olympiad 1991, Kőszegi graduated magna cum laude in mathematics from Harvard University in 1996. He earned his doctoral degree in economics from MIT in 2000, under the supervision of Nobel laureate Peter Diamond and Romneycare/Obamacare architect Jon Gruber.

Career 

After completing his PhD, Kőszegi joined the faculty of UC Berkeley.  In 2002–03, he was also a visiting faculty member at his alma mater MIT. In 2012, he accepted an appointment at Central European University, ultimately leaving UC Berkeley in 2013.

Scholarship 

Kőszegi is a theoretical economist with an interest in behavioral economics, who has studied, among other topics, temporal utility and addiction.

According to Kőszegi, behavioral economics is not so much a branch of economics, as an attitude of the economists engaged in studying it. "Behaviorists simply strive to start from the most realistic human behavior possible." Further, while the notion of nudging popularized by Richard H. Thaler and Cass R. Sunstein paints behavioral economists as libertarian paternalists, Kőszegi says that behaviorists are generally afraid of paternalism.

Together with Matthew Rabin, Kőszegi developed a formal model to address criticisms of prospect theory. This work has been discussed in behavioral economics.

This joint work shows that, while laissez-faire regulation is usually considered synonymous with competitive markets, for complex products the right regulations can foster, and are necessary for, competition. For example, in complex markets that require a high level of research from customers to get a good deal, price caps can be effective both in helping the less well-off and also in boosting competition.

The ranking system of RePEc puts Kőszegi in the top 5% of economists for 26 of its criteria, including Number of Citations and h-index, among others.

Awards 
In 2015, the Yrjö Jahnsson Foundation awarded  Kőszegi its biennial Yrjö Jahnsson Award, which is given to "young European economists who have made a significant contribution to theoretical and applied research in terms of the study of economics in Europe." Kőszegi received the award "for his contribution to the theoretical foundations of behavioral economics, and its application to public finance and contract theory." He is also a fellow of the European Economic Association.

References 

University of California, Berkeley College of Letters and Science faculty
Academic staff of Central European University
MIT School of Humanities, Arts, and Social Sciences alumni
Harvard College alumni
American economists
Behavioral economists
21st-century Hungarian economists
Living people
Year of birth missing (living people)
Fellows of the European Economic Association
Fellows of the Econometric Society